EMSO simulator is an equation-oriented process simulator with a graphical interface for modeling complex dynamic or steady-state processes.  It is CAPE-OPEN compliant.  EMSO stands for Environment for Modeling, Simulation, and Optimization.  The ALSOC Project - a Portuguese acronym for Free Environment for Simulation, Optimization and Control of Processes -, which is based at the UFRGS, develops, maintains and distributes this object-oriented software.  Pre-built models are available in the EMSO Modeling Library (EML).  New models can be written in the EMSO modeling language or a user can embed models coded in C, C++ or Fortran into the simulation environment.

See also
 AMPL
 APMonitor
 ASCEND
 General Algebraic Modeling System
 JModelica.org
 MATLAB
 Modelica
 List of chemical process simulators

References

External links
 ALSOC Project
 Blog posts regarding EMSO

Simulation software
Computer-aided engineering software
Simulation programming languages
Mathematical optimization software
Object-oriented programming